Glyphodes basifascialis is a moth in the family Crambidae. It was described by George Hampson in 1899. It is found in Australia, Cameroon, the Democratic Republic of the Congo (Katanga, Orientale, Equateur), the Seychelles, South Africa and Tanzania.

The larvae feed on Ficus species.

References

Moths described in 1899
Glyphodes